Nyabinghi can refer to:

 One of the Mansions of Rastafari, see Nyabinghi
 Nyabinghi rhythm
 Niyabinghi chants
 Nyabinghi drums